John Edward Kerris (January 30, 1925 – December 4, 1983) was an American professional basketball player. Kerris played college basketball for Loyola of Chicago and was the ninth overall pick in the 1949 BAA draft by the Chicago Stags. He played for the Tri-Cities Blackhawks, Fort Wayne Pistons and Baltimore Bullets in his four-year career.

External links
 Stats @ Basketball-reference.com
 Jack Kerris at LoyolaRamblers.com

1925 births
1983 deaths
American men's basketball players
Baltimore Bullets (1944–1954) players
Basketball players from Chicago
Chicago Stags draft picks
De La Salle Institute alumni
Fort Wayne Pistons players
Loyola Ramblers men's basketball players
Power forwards (basketball)
Tri-Cities Blackhawks players